Albert M. "Buck" Elton II is a retired United States Air Force major general who last served as the commander of the Special Operations Joint Task Force–Afghanistan and NATO Special Operations Component Command–Afghanistan. Previously, he was the deputy director for special operations and counterterrorism of the Joint Staff. Raised in Lone Pine, California, Elton earned a B.S. degree in management from the United States Air Force Academy in 1989. He later received a Master of Aviation Science degree from Embry–Riddle Aeronautical University in 1996.

References

External links
 

Year of birth missing (living people)
Living people
Place of birth missing (living people)
People from Inyo County, California
United States Air Force Academy alumni
Embry–Riddle Aeronautical University alumni
Recipients of the Legion of Merit
United States Air Force generals
Recipients of the Defense Superior Service Medal